The Nuri class is a series of 8 containers ships built for HMM. The ships were built by Hyundai Heavy Industries in South Korea. The ships were ordered in 2018 together with the 12 ships from the Algeciras class and have a maximum theoretical capacity of 16,010 TEU. The first ship of this series is expected to enter into service in the second quarter 2021.

List of ships

See also 

 HMM Algeciras-class container ship
 Hyundai Dream-class container ship
 Hyundai Together-class container ship
 Hyundai Earth-class container ship

References 

Container ship classes
Ships built by Hyundai Heavy Industries Group